Japanese boy band Kanjani Eight have gone on a total of nine concert tours, all domestic, and several shows. In 2006, they went on their first tour F.T.O.N: Funky Tokyo Osaka Nagoya, at the three major cities the concert tour was named after. Upon the success of the initial tour, it was expanded into a national tour in the fall of that same year, performing at a total of 11 cities and 26 performances. Winter of that same year, Kanjani Eight performed a national promo tour for the release of their single "Kan Fu Fighting". performing at a total of six cities and performing twenty six times.

In 2007, Kanjani Eight begun their biggest national tour to date, the "Eh?! Honma?! Bikkuri!! Tour". The concert tour began in the spring of 2007 and ended in the fall of that same year, totaling at 113 performances in all 47 prefectures of Japan. The concert tour also marked the first time in which a signed Johnny's talent performed in every prefecture of Japan in a single tour. After the success of that tour in 2008, Kanjani Eight performed two national tours between May and August performing at a total fourteen cities and over fifty performances.

Kanjani Eight released Puzzle in 2009 and the national tour Puzzle in the summer of that year. Following up that tour in the winter of 2009, they returned to the Kyocera Dome and performed their first Countdown Live concert series. In the winter of 2010, Kanjani Eight performed their 8 Uppers concert tour, which also contained their second Countdown Live. In 2011, Kanjani Eight performed their winter tour which consisted five cities for a total of ten performances. This tour also contained their third countdown live. In 2012, Kanjani Eight performed their 8EST concert tour, which was a total of 40 performances. This tour is noted for the fact that they performed at their first stadium and for that it did not include a countdown live.

Concert tours

Other performances

References

Concerts
Kanjani Eight